Dontreix is a commune in the Creuse department in the Nouvelle-Aquitaine region in central France.

Geography
On its eastern side, the commune borders the department of Puy-de-Dôme

Population

Sights
 The twelfth-century church.
 Traces of two feudal castles at Matroux and Beaulieu.
 Roman remains (possibly an altar).
A Megalith, the roc de Saint Julien, in the forest of Drouilles.

See also
Communes of the Creuse department

References

Communes of Creuse